AeroAndina S.A. is a Colombian aircraft manufacturer based in Cali. The company was founded in 1971 as Agrocopteros Ltda to produce gyroplanes and later helicopters and biplanes. In 1998 the name was changed to Tecnologias Aeronauticas S.A. and it was known as Aerotec S.A.. The company was liquidated in the early 2000s and reformed under its present name.

The company now specializes in the design and manufacture of ultralight aircraft and light-sport aircraft. During its history the company has produced 440 aircraft.

Aircraft

References

External links

Aircraft manufacturers of Colombia
Manufacturing companies established in 1971
Colombian brands
Colombian companies established in 1971